John Henry Howell (31 October 1869 – 20 June 1944) was a New Zealand technical college principal and Quaker. He was born in Frampton Cotterell, Gloucestershire, England on 31 October 1869.

References

1869 births
1944 deaths
New Zealand Quakers
New Zealand educators
People from South Gloucestershire District
English emigrants to New Zealand